Trailokyanath is a surname. Notable people with the surname include:

Trailokyanath Sanyal (1848–1915), Brahmo missionary
Trailokyanath Chakravarty (1889–1970), Indian revolutionary and politician